X Factor is a Danish television music competition showcasing new singing talent. Thomas Blachman and Martin Jensen returned as judges while Oh Land quitted and Kwamie Liv became her replacement and Sofie Linde returned as the host.

For the first time on the Danish X Factor, all groups were eliminated in the first 3 live shows.

Judges and hosts
Thomas Blachman and Martin Jensen returned as judges while Oh Land decided to quit as a judge and Kwamie Liv became the new judge Sofie Linde returned as the main host.

Changes
For the first time on the Danish X Factor, no categories were given to the judges. Instead they mentored one act from each category, one from the 15 to 22s, one from the Over 23s and one group in the live shows.

Selection process
Auditions took place in Copenhagen and Aarhus.

The 18 successful acts were:
Thomas Blachman: Emma & Filip, Mads Moldt, Maria Ranum, Lasse Skriver, Meseret Tesfamichael, Wela & Garcia
Kwamie Liv: 2 Harmonies, Oliver Antonio, Rune Duch, Mathias Julin, Lorenzo & Charlo, Tina Mellemgaard
Martin Jensen: Mille Bergholtz, Kári Fossdalsá, Lotte Røntved Knudsen, Oscar, RoxorLoops & Jasmin, Sofie Thomsen

Bootcamp

The 9 eliminated acts were:
Thomas Blachman: Emma & Filip, Lasse Skriver, Meseret Tesfamichael
Kwamie Liv: 2 Harmonies, Rune Duch, Mathias Julin
Martin Jensen: Lotte Røntved Knudsen, RoxorLoops & Jasmin, Sofie Thomsen

Contestants

Key:
 – Winner
 – Runner-up
 – 3rd Place

Live shows

Colour key

Contestants' colour key:
{|
|-
| – Kwamie Liv's Contestants
|-
| – Thomas Blachmans's Contestants
|-
| – Martin Jensen's Contestants
|}

Live show details

Week 1 (February 26) 
Theme: Signature

Judges' votes to eliminate
 Blachman: Oscar
 Liv: Kári Fossdalsá
 Jensen: Oscar

Week 2 (March 4) 
Theme: 200th Program anniversary
Musical Guest: Saveus ("Dark Vibrations")

Judges' votes to eliminate
 Blachman: Lorenzo & Charlo
 Liv: Wela & Garcia
 Jensen: Wela & Garcia

Week 3 (March 11) 
Theme: SoMe-Stars (Social Media Stars)
Musical Guest: Ericka Jane ("Forget Being Sober")

Judges' votes to eliminate 
 Jensen: Lorenzo & Charlo
 Liv: Kári Fossdalsá
 Blachman: Lorenzo & Charlo

Week 4 (March 18) 
Theme: TV & Movie Songs

Judges' votes to eliminate 
 Blachman: Oliver Antonio
 Jensen: Tina Mellemgaard
 Liv: Oliver Antonio

Week 5 (March 25) 
Theme: Nordic Artists
Group Performance: "Noget for nogen"
Musical Guest: Molly Sandén ("Nån annan nu")

Judges' votes to eliminate 
 Blachman: Mille Bergholtz
 Jensen: Maria Ranum
 Liv: Maria Ranum

Week 6: Semi-final (1 April)
 Theme: Party & The Day After
 Musical Guest: Solveig Lindelof ("Superficial")

The semi-final did not feature a sing-off and instead the act with the fewest public votes, Mille Bergholtz was automacally eliminated

Week 7: Final (April 8) 
Theme: Judges Choice, Duet with a Special Guest, Winner Song
Musical Guests: Brandon Beal & Lukas Graham together with the 3 finalists Tina, Kári & Mads Moldt  ("Higher"), Dean Lewis "Hurtless"
Group Performance: Cover Me in Sunshine" (P!nk performed by the 9 finalists) "Half A Man"/"Be Alright" (Dean Lewis performed by Dean Lewis & The Auditionees)

References

The X Factor seasons
2022 Danish television seasons